Rudolf Matta (born 20 July 1968) is a retired Slovak football defender.

References

1968 births
Living people
Slovak footballers
1. FC Tatran Prešov players
AC Sparta Prague players
Dukla Prague footballers
FC DAC 1904 Dunajská Streda players
Kuopion Palloseura players
Czechoslovak First League players
Association football defenders
Slovak expatriate footballers
Expatriate footballers in Finland
Slovak expatriate sportspeople in Finland
Czechoslovakia under-21 international footballers
Sportspeople from Prešov